Gizela Dali (born Adamantia Mavroidi ; 27 August 1937 – 10 September 2010) was a Greek actress. She was born in 1937 in Plaka Athens, and she died of cancer in 2010, aged 73.

Filmography
 Testosterone (2004)     
 Fountains of Lust (1976) - Eftyhia
 Aimilia, the Psychopath (1974) – Aimilia / Aimilia's mother
 Image of Love (1973) – Eliza
 Passion Beach (1973) – Mary
 The Sexy Mirella (1973) – Mirella
 O Kyklos tis Anomalias (1971) – Anna Levidi
 The Executioner (1970) – Anna
 Polytehnitis kai erimospitis (1963) – Lucia
 Betty is getting married (1961) – Betty
 İstanbul'da aşk başkadır (1961)
 ``Τρία κορίτσια απ΄την Αμέρικα`` (1964)

References
 
  2. Istanbul'da aşk başkadır https://www.imdb.com/title/tt0373932/

External links

1937 births
2010 deaths
Greek film actresses
20th-century Greek actresses
21st-century Greek actresses
Actresses from Athens
Deaths from cancer in Greece